Ilmi Lovisa Hallsten (née Bergroth; 25 December 1862, in Föglö – 4 January 1936) was a Finnish secondary school teacher and politician. She was a member of the Parliament of Finland from 1919 to 1922, representing the National Coalition Party. She was married to Onni Hallsten.

She went to the Swedish co-educational school Nya svenska samskolan.

References

1862 births
1936 deaths
People from Föglö
People from Turku and Pori Province (Grand Duchy of Finland)
National Coalition Party politicians
Members of the Parliament of Finland (1919–22)
Finnish educators
Finnish schoolteachers
Women members of the Parliament of Finland